Anatrachyntis coriacella is a moth in the family Cosmopterigidae. It was described by Snellen in 1901, and is known from Indonesia (Java), India, Malaysia, Mauritius, United States and Australia.

The larvae feed on Malvaceae (Gossypium sp.).

References

Moths described in 1901
Anatrachyntis
Moths of Mauritius
Moths of Asia
Moths of North America
Moths of Australia